Waleed Ouda (born 1973) is a Palestinian novelist. He was born in Kuwait. He has a PhD in computer engineering and currently works in the United Arab Emirates. He has written four novels. He was a participant in the 2012 International Prize for Arabic Fiction Nadwa, organized to encourage the work of promising young Arab writers.

References

1973 births
Living people
Palestinian novelists
Date of birth missing (living people)
21st-century Palestinian writers